Absolute Entertainment was an American video game publishing company. Through its development house, Imagineering, Absolute Entertainment produced titles for the Amiga, Atari 2600, Atari 7800, Game Gear, Genesis/Mega Drive,  Sega CD, Game Boy, Nintendo Entertainment System, and Super Nintendo Entertainment System video game consoles, as well as for IBM PC compatibles.

After leaving his position as a video game developer and designer at Activision, Garry Kitchen founded the company in 1986 with his brother Dan Kitchen, along with Alex DeMeo, John Van Ryzin. The company's headquarters was in Glen Rock, New Jersey, but later moved to another New Jersey borough, Upper Saddle River. While the company was based in New Jersey, David Crane worked out of his home on the West Coast.  The company's name was chosen because it was alphabetically above Activision, implying that Absolute Entertainment was superior to Activision. It was the same strategy that Activision chose when the programmers left Atari.

At Absolute Entertainment, Kitchen continued developing games for the Atari 2600 and Atari 7800, as he had done at Activision. However, the Nintendo Entertainment System (NES) had already displaced Atari's dominance of the video game console market. Kitchen swiftly shifted his focus to the NES, and produced several games for the platform, beginning with A Boy and His Blob: Trouble on Blobolonia in 1989, and Battle Tank in 1990.

Absolute Entertainment absorbed its studio Imagineering in 1992 to become itself a video game developer for the first time.

In the third quarter of 1995, Absolute Entertainment went bankrupt and suspended operations and laid off most of its staff. Since Kitchen had already formed a new company with David Crane called Skyworks Technologies, some of the employees transitioned to the new company.

References

Companies based in Bergen County, New Jersey
Video game companies established in 1986
Video game companies disestablished in 1995
Defunct companies based in New Jersey
Video game publishers
Defunct video game companies of the United States
1986 establishments in New Jersey
Companies that filed for Chapter 11 bankruptcy in 1995